Seo Whi-min (born 13 March 2002) is a South Korean short track speed skater who competed at the 2022 Winter Olympics.

Career
Seo made her World Cup debut at the 2019–20 ISU Short Track Speed Skating World Cup and finished with seven podium finishes.

She represented South Korea at the 2020 Winter Youth Olympics and won a gold medal in the 500 metres and 1000 metres events. She also won a bronze medal in the mixed team relay.

She represented South Korea at the 2022 Winter Olympics in the 3000 metre relay and won a silver medal.

References

External links

2002 births
Living people
Four Continents Short Track Speed Skating Championships medalists
Medalists at the 2022 Winter Olympics
Olympic short track speed skaters of South Korea
Olympic silver medalists for South Korea
Olympic medalists in short track speed skating
Short track speed skaters at the 2020 Winter Youth Olympics
Short track speed skaters at the 2022 Winter Olympics
South Korean female short track speed skaters
Speed skaters from Seoul
Youth Olympic gold medalists for South Korea
World Short Track Speed Skating Championships medalists
21st-century South Korean women
Competitors at the 2023 Winter World University Games
Medalists at the 2023 Winter World University Games
Universiade medalists in short track speed skating
Universiade gold medalists for South Korea
Universiade bronze medalists for South Korea